The 2018 Italian F4 Championship Powered by Abarth was the fifth season of the Italian F4 Championship. It began on 29 April in Imola and finished on 21 October in Monza after seven triple header rounds.

The title was clinched by Enzo Fittipaldi, who won the season finale.

Teams and drivers

Race calendar and results
The calendar was published on 22 October 2017. For the first time in the history of the championship, it included a circuit outside of Italy with a round being held at Circuit Paul Ricard in Southern France.

Championship standings

Points were awarded to the top 10 classified finishers in each race. No points were awarded for pole position or fastest lap. Only the best sixteen results were counted towards the championship.

Drivers' standings

Rookies' standings

Teams' championship

Notes

References

External links

Italian F4 Championship seasons
Italian
F4 Championship
Italian F4